Bancannia Lake is an Endorheic lake in the Bulloo-Bancannia drainage basin of Far West New South Wales.

References

Lakes of New South Wales